Manica is a province of Mozambique. It has an area of 62,272 km² and a population of 1,945,994 (2017 census). The province is surrounded by Zimbabwe in the west, Tete Province in the northwest, Sofala Province in the east, Save River in the south, and Zambezi river in the northeast. Chimoio is the capital of the province. The highest mountain in Mozambique, Mount Binga (2436 m), lies in this province near the border with Zimbabwe. The Manica province is divided into nine districts and 34 administrative regions.

History
The province was located in the old Manica kingdom which probably existed since medieval times and existed until the 19th century. Several larger towns in the region were founded before the Portuguese arrival. In the 8th century the province came under the control of Munhumutapa Empire and had commercial relations with Arab-Swahili traders in the coastal regions.

Later it came under the Portuguese influence. The territory of the current province was part of the grant of the Mozambique Company, established in 1891. The territory came under direct control under the Portuguese colonial administration in 1942, the "District of Beira" was established, which came to be known as the "District of Manica and Sofala" in 1947.

On 5 August 1970 this district was divided into "District Vila Pery" (the old name of Chimoio) and "District of Sofala". During the period of the transitional government (7 September 1974 to 25 June 1975) the District of Vila Pery was renamed "Province of Vila Pery" and later to its present name.

In 2008, when the incumbent president of Zimbabwe, Robert Mugabe lost the first round of the presidential elections, violence broke out in the country. This forced large number of people to flee to Manica.

The province is headed by a provincial governor who is appointed by the President. Raimundo Diomba was the governor from 2005–07, Maurício Vieira from 2007 to 2010. Ana Comoana is the current provincial governor. Landmines are present in the province and deaths caused by them have been reported.

Demographics

Economy 
The inhabitants practice subsistence farming. Main products are maize, cassava and goat meat. Agriculture is favored by the high rainfall and mild climate. Cashews were once an important export product. Manica Province is rich in terms of gold, copper and base metal. Many farm workers from Zimbabwe have migrated to the province because of the conflicts in their country. The total number of such migrants is disputed and may range from 4,000 to 40,000.

Districts

Manica Province is divided into 12 districts:

Báruè District
Chimoio District
Gondola District
Guro District
Macate District
Machaze District
Macossa District
Manica District
Mossurize District
Sussundenga District
Tambara District
Vanduzi District
In 2013, the Mozambican government created Chimoio and Macate districts from portions of Gondola District, and Vanduzi District from portions of Manica and Gondola districts.

References

Bibliography 
 
 
 
 

 
Provinces of Mozambique